Church of Staints Cosmas and Damian is a church of the Serbian Orthodox Church, located in the Ostatija - Koritnik mountain Golija in the , Ivanjica. It is a medieval historical and cultural monument in Serbia. The church belongs to the Eparchy of Žiča. It was located in the middle of a necropolis.

The church was built in the 17th century and is believed to have been built during the Ottoman rule. It was first restored  in the 18th century, whereas the most recent restoration was carried out in 1937.

Architecture

Church of Sts. Cosmas and Damian is a simple, single-naved building with a semicircular altar apse. It is built in rubble and plastered inside and out. During the restoration of the church in 1937, large window frames were made. The vault was reinforced with concrete beams, and the roof was covered with tiles.

The church is noted for its lavishly decorated portal, which is decorated with geometric ornaments which reveal a strong Oriental influence. A large number of inscriptions from various periods in the history of the church are preserved on the doorpost.

References

External links

Ivanjica
Serbian Orthodox church buildings in Serbia